East Richmond Heights is an unincorporated community and census-designated place (CDP) in western Contra Costa County, California, United States. Its population was 3,280 at the 2010 census.

Geography
Situated at the north end of the Berkeley Hills, East Richmond Heights overlooks the northern part of the San Francisco Bay.  This small residential community is bordered by El Cerrito to the south, with the Richmond Heights neighborhood of Richmond to the west, and Wildcat Canyon Regional Park to the north and east.

Arlington Boulevard, a major north-south thoroughfare traversing the Berkeley and El Cerrito portions of the Berkeley Hills, runs through the center of the community and terminates at its north end.  Interstate 80 is located about one-half mile to the west, and provides access to the community via its Solano and McBryde Avenue exits.

Government and municipal services
Police services for the community are provided by the Contra Costa County Sheriff's Office Bay Station.  Traffic services are handled by the California Highway Patrol.  The county contracts with the adjacent city of Richmond to provide fire fighting services. Garbage, recycling, and compost collection are provided by Republic Services. Mail delivered to addresses within the community are addressed to the city of Richmond or El Cerrito, depending on their location within the CDP. Nonetheless, these addresses are not located within Richmond or El Cerrito.

Education
It is in the West Contra Costa Unified School District.

East Richmond Heights is home to Mira Vista Elementary School, which is part of the school district.  Additionally, Adams Middle School (now closed), a portion of Serra Adult School (now West County Mandarin School) and Saint David School are also located within the CDP. Also, one of the country's oldest cooperative elementary schools, Crestmont School, is located within the CDP on Arlington Boulevard.

Commerce
This mostly residential community is home to a few small retail businesses including a convenience store and laundromat.

Demographics

2010
The 2010 United States Census reported that East Richmond Heights had a population of 3,280. The racial makeup of East Richmond Heights was 1,995 (60.8%) White, 395 (12.0%) African American, 13 (0.4%) Native American, 407 (12.4%) Asian, 8 (0.2%) Pacific Islander, 187 (5.7%) from other races, and 275 (8.4%) from two or more races. Hispanic or Latino of any race were 465 persons (14.2%).

The Census reported that 99.9% of the population lived in households and 0.1% were institutionalized.

There were 1,385 households, out of which 364 (26.3%) had children under the age of 18 living in them, 614 (44.3%) were opposite-sex married couples living together, 164 (11.8%) had a female householder with no husband present, 69 (5.0%) had a male householder with no wife present.  There were 104 (7.5%) unmarried opposite-sex partnerships, and 30 (2.2%) same-sex married couples or partnerships. 395 households (28.5%) were made up of individuals, and 137 (9.9%) had someone living alone who was 65 years of age or older. The average household size was 2.37.  There were 847 families (61.2% of all households); the average family size was 2.92.

The population was spread out, with 585 people (17.8%) under the age of 18, 203 people (6.2%) aged 18 to 24, 793 people (24.2%) aged 25 to 44, 1,162 people (35.4%) aged 45 to 64, and 537 people (16.4%) who were 65 years of age or older.  The median age was 46.2 years. For every 100 females there were 94.1 males.  For every 100 females age 18 and over, there were 93.3 males.

The homeowner vacancy rate was 1.8%; the rental vacancy rate was 3.3%.  2,622 people (79.9% of the population) lived in owner-occupied housing units and 654 people (19.9%) lived in rental housing units.

2000
As of the census of 2000, there were 3,357 people, 1,377 households, and 885 families residing in the CDP. The racial makeup of the CDP was 64.13% White, 13.94% Black or African American, 0.66% Native American, 10.72% Asian, 0.54% Pacific Islander, 3.90% from other races, and 6.11% from two or more races.  10.66% of the aforementioned population groups are also Hispanic or Latino of any race.

There were 1,377 households, out of which 23.6% had children under the age of 18 living with them, 48.7% were married couples living together, 11.4% had a female householder with no husband present, and 35.7% were non-families. 26.9% of all households were made up of individuals, and 10.1% had someone living alone who was 65 years of age or older.  The average household size was 2.43 and the average family size was 2.94.

In the CDP the population was spread out, with 19.0% under the age of 18, 5.6% from 18 to 24, 29.8% from 25 to 44, 31.0% from 45 to 64, and 14.5% who were 65 years of age or older.  The median age was 42 years. For every 100 females there were 94.5 males.  For every 100 females age 18 and over, there were 91.2 males.

The median income for a household in the CDP was $89,500, and the median income for a family was $93,274. Males had a median income of $62,798 versus $36,844 for females. The per capita income for the CDP was $38,833.  About 1.52% of families and 2.63 % of the population were below the poverty line, including 6.4% of those under age 18 and 3.9% of those age 65 or over.

The percentages of languages spoke by residents in East Richmond Heights are 87.80% English, 8.59% Spanish, 1.54% Vietnamese, 1.37 Cantonese, 0.68% Japanese.

Notes

External links

Census-designated places in Contra Costa County, California
Unincorporated communities in Contra Costa County, California
Berkeley Hills